Manas is a village in the Talas District of Talas Region of Kyrgyzstan. Its population was 4,603 in 2021. It is the seat of the Talas District.

References

Populated places in Talas Region